is an annual professional wrestling event promoted by New Japan Pro-Wrestling (NJPW). 

It was originally held from 1993 to 1995 and again from 2000 to 2001 in Fukuoka at the Fukuoka Dome. The event was revived in 2009 and has since been held at the Fukuoka Kokusai Center on Constitution Memorial Day, a national holiday in Japan on May 3, and aired as a pay-per-view (PPV). From 2013 to 2014, the event also aired outside Japan as an internet pay-per-view (iPPV). Since 2015, the event has aired worldwide on NJPW's internet streaming site, NJPW World. In 2018 and 2019, Wrestling Dontaku took place over two back-to-back shows. The event was originally scheduled to take place in 2020 on May 3 and May 4, but was cancelled due to the COVID-19 pandemic. "Dontaku" is an obsolete Japanese word for holiday, derived from the Dutch word for Sunday, "Zondag", used in reference to Hakata Dontaku, a Fukuoka-based festival held in early May, the same time as the event. In 2022, the event took place on May 1 at Fukuoka PayPay Dome, formerly known as the Fukuoka Dome. This was the first time that Wrestling Dontaku was held in the domed venue since 2001.

Events

1993

1994

1995

2000

The fourth Wrestling Dontaku, first in five years, was held on May 5, 2000, in Fukuoka, Fukuoka, at the Fukuoka Dome. The event featured eight matches, two of which were contested for championships. The event opened with the finals of the 2000 Young Lion Cup, where Kenzo Suzuki defeated Shinya Makabe, who later became better known as Togi Makabe, winning the IWGP Heavyweight Championship. In the semi-main event, Manabu Nakanishi and Yuji Nagata successfully defended the IWGP Tag Team Championship against Kazunari Murakami and Naoya Ogawa, while in the main event, Kensuke Sasaki, using his Power Warrior persona, defeated The Great Muta to retain the IWGP Heavyweight Championship.

2001

The fifth Wrestling Dontaku was held on May 5, 2001, in Fukuoka, Fukuoka, at the Fukuoka Dome. The event featured nine matches, one of which was contested for a championship. In the title match, El Samurai and Jyushin Thunder Liger defeated the Mexican brother tag team of Dr. Wagner, Jr. and Silver King to retain the IWGP Junior Heavyweight Tag Team Championship. The event also featured appearances by mixed martial artists Don Frye and Rainy Martinez.

2009

2010

2011

2012

2013

2014

2015

2016

2017

2018

2019

2021

2022

See also

List of New Japan Pro-Wrestling pay-per-view events

References

External links
The official New Japan Pro-Wrestling website
Wrestling Dontaku at ProWrestlingHistory.com

 
1994 in professional wrestling
1995 in professional wrestling
2000 in professional wrestling
2001 in professional wrestling